These are the results of the men's K-1 500 metres competition in canoeing at the 2004 Summer Olympics.  The K-1 event is raced by single-man canoe sprint kayaks.

Medalists

Heats
The 28 competitors first raced in three heats for position in one of three semifinal races.  As there are 9 lanes on the course, 27 of 28 kayakers moved on.  The heats were raced on August 24.

Semifinals
The top three finishers in each of the three semifinals qualified for the final.  Fourth place and higher competitors were eliminated.   The semifinals were raced on August 26.

Final
The final was raced on August 28.

References
2004 Summer Olympics Canoe sprint results 
Sports-reference.com 2004 men's K-1 500 m results
Yahoo! Sports Athens 2004 Summer Olympics Canoe/Kayak Results

Men's K-1 0500
Men's events at the 2004 Summer Olympics